Bernhard Klee (born 19 April 1936) is a German conductor, originally from Schleiz, in Thuringia. He studied piano with Else Schmitz-Gohr. Trained as a member of the Thomanerchor, he has since conducted many of Europe's most prestigious orchestras including the Vienna Philharmonic and State Philharmonic of Rheinland-Palatinate.

He was married to the Swiss soprano Edith Mathis.

References

German male conductors (music)
People from Schleiz
1936 births
Living people
20th-century German conductors (music)
21st-century German conductors (music)
20th-century German male musicians
21st-century German male musicians